Imidazothiazoles are a class of chemical compounds containing a bicyclic heterocycle (a double ring system) consisting of an imidazole ring fused to a thiazole ring. The structure contains three non-carbon or heteroatoms: two nitrogen atoms and one sulfur atom. Imidazothiazole derivatives show a broad spectrum of in vitro, i.e. "in the petri dish", activity such as anticancer, antipsychotic, antimicrobial, antifungal, and anthelmintic (against cancer, psychosis, microorganisms, fungi and worms, respectively).

References 

Nitrogen heterocycles
Sulfur heterocycles